William Donald Lindsey (born April 12, 1960) is an American former professional baseball catcher. He played during one season at the major league level for the Chicago White Sox of Major League Baseball (MLB).

Career
Lindsey played baseball at Hollywood Hills High School in Hollywood, Florida where he was teammates with Bob Fallon, who would also go on to play for the White Sox.

Lindsey played his first professional season with their Rookie league Paintsville Yankees in 1981, and his last with the White Sox' Triple-A Vancouver Canadians in 1988.

On May 4, 1984, while playing for the Nashville Sounds, the Double-A affiliate of the Yankees, Lindsey caught a no-hitter by batterymate Jim Deshaies.

References

External links

1960 births
Living people
Albany-Colonie Yankees players
American expatriate baseball players in Canada
Birmingham Barons players
Broward Seahawks baseball players
Chicago White Sox players
Columbus Clippers players
Fort Lauderdale Yankees players
Greensboro Hornets players
Hawaii Islanders players
Lindsey, Bill
Major League Baseball catchers
Nashville Sounds players
Paintsville Yankees players
Sportspeople from Staten Island
Baseball players from New York City
Vancouver Canadians players